= Woman, Bird, Star (Homage to Pablo Picasso) =

C. 1970 painting by Joan Miró

- Artist: Joan Miró
- Year: 1966-1973
- Medium: Oil on canvas
- Movement: Surrealism
- Dimensions: 170 cm × 245 cm (67 in × 96 in)
- Location: Museo Nacional Centro de Arte Reina Sofía, Madrid

Woman, Bird, Star (Homage to Pablo Picasso) is an oil on canvas painting by the Spanish artist Joan Miró, created between 1966 and 1973. It has been in the collection of the Museo Nacional Centro de Arte Reina Sofía, in Madrid, since 1988. The painting was finished on the day of the death of Picasso, and so Miró decided to dedicate it to him.
